Shiroishi Station may refer to the following train stations in Japan:

 Shiroishi Station (Kumamoto), on the Hisatsu Line in Ashikita, Kumamoto Prefecture
 Shiroishi Station (Miyagi), on the Tōhoku Main Line in Shiroishi, Miyagi Prefecture
 Shiroishi Station (JR Hokkaido), on the Chitose Line and Hakodate Main Line in Sapporo, Hokkaidō
 Shiroishi Station (Sapporo Municipal Subway), subway station in Sapporo, Hokkaidō

See also
 Higashi-Shiroishi Station, on the Tōhoku Main Line in Shiroishi, Miyagi Prefecture
 Hizen-Shiroishi Station, on the Nagasaki Main Line in Shiroishi, Saga Prefecture
 Shiroishi-Zaō Station, on the Tōhoku Shinkansen in Shiroishi, Miyagi Prefecture